Coffeetown Grist Mill is a historic grist mill located at Williams Township, Northampton County, Pennsylvania.  It was built in 1762, and is a banked building measuring  stories high on the banked side.  The building measures 36 feet by 50 feet, and assumed its present size with additions made in the 19th century. The mill was converted to a fertilizer factory in the 1920s.  The building was also used as a temporary schoolhouse and post office. The building is now a private residence.

It was added to the National Register of Historic Places in 1977.

Gallery

References

Grinding mills on the National Register of Historic Places in Pennsylvania
Industrial buildings completed in 1762
Buildings and structures in Northampton County, Pennsylvania
Grinding mills in Pennsylvania
National Register of Historic Places in Northampton County, Pennsylvania